The phonological system of the Polish language is similar in many ways to those of other Slavic languages, although there are some characteristic features found in only a few other languages of the family, such as contrasting postalveolar and alveolo-palatal fricatives and affricates. The vowel system is relatively simple, with just six oral monophthongs and arguably two nasals in traditional speech, while the consonant system is much more complex.

Vowels 

The Polish vowel system consists of six oral sounds. Traditionally, it was also said to include two nasal monophthongs, with Polish considered the last Slavic language that had preserved nasal sounds that existed in Proto-Slavic. However, recent sources present for modern Polish a vowel system without nasal vowel phonemes, including only the aforementioned six oral vowels.

Oral

Close 
  is close front unrounded . It is somewhat more open than cardinal .
  ranges from almost close-mid near-front  to (advanced) close-mid central  or alternatively from near-close near-front unrounded  to close-mid central unrounded . These descriptions are essentially equivalent. Traditionally,  is used in narrow transcriptions (as if close central unrounded). Older sources describe this vowel as follows: 
 According to  it is articulated with the centre of the tongue raised up and moved somewhat forward; the pharynx also widens.
A realization close to near-close near front unrounded  is present in northeastern dialects.
  is close back rounded . It is somewhat more open than cardinal ,  and intermediate between them in terms of labialization.

Mid
  is open-mid front unrounded . It is somewhat more open than cardinal .
 According to the British phonetician John C. Wells, it is often noticeably centralized : somewhat closer to a central vowel  in palatal contexts.
  is open-mid back. It is somewhat more open than cardinal ,  and intermediate between them in terms of labialization.
 There is no complete agreement about the rounding of :
In the latter case, the lack of rounding is compensated for by a stronger retraction of the tongue.

Open
  is open central unrounded . However,  describes it broadly as open front unrounded . Traditionally,  is used even in otherwise narrow transcriptions.
She uses  for the main central allophone.

Distribution

The vowels  and  have largely complementary distribution. Either vowel may follow a labial consonant, as in mi ('to me') and my ('we'). Elsewhere, however,  is usually restricted to word-initial position and positions after alveolo-palatal consonants and approximants , while  cannot appear in those positions (see § Hard and soft consonants below). Either vowel may follow a velar fricative  but after velar  the vowel  is limited to rare loanwords e.g. kynologia  ('cynology') and gyros  ('gyro'). However,  appears outside its usual positions in some foreign-derived words, as in chipsy  ('potato chips') and tir  ('large lorry', see TIR). The degree of palatalization in these contexts is weak. In some phonological descriptions of Polish that make a phonemic distinction between palatalized and unpalatalized consonants,  and  may thus be treated as allophones of a single phoneme.

Nasal
Nasal vowels do not feature uniform nasality over their duration. Therefore, they are phonetically diphthongs. (For nasality following other vowel nuclei, see § Allophony below.)

Phonological status
The nasal phonemes  appear in older phonological descriptions of Polish e.g. In more recent descriptions the orthographic nasal vowels ą, ę are analyzed as two phonemes in all contexts e.g. , . Under such an analysis, the list of consonantal phonemes is extended by a velar nasal phoneme  or by two nasal approximants , .

Distribution
If analyzed as separate phonemes, nasal vowels do not occur except before a fricative and in word-final position. When the letters ą and ę appear before stops and affricates, they indicate an oral  or  followed by a nasal consonant homorganic with the following consonant. The  sequence is also denasalized to // in word-final position, as in   'I will be'.

Historical development
Distinctive vowel length was inherited from late Proto-Slavic, although in Polish only some pretonic long vowels and vowels with the neoacute retained length. Additional vowel lengths were introduced in Proto-Polish (as in other West Slavic languages) as a result of compensatory lengthening when a yer in the next syllable disappeared according to Havlík's law. In Polish this only happened in penultimate syllables (which thus became final syllables) before a voiced consonant (in other Slavic languages where a similar process occurred this could be more general).

The resultant system of vowel lengths was similar to what is today preserved in Czech and to a lesser degree in Slovak, although the distribution of the sounds often differed (for example in Czech the old acute also lengthened vowels). In the emerging modern Polish, however, the long vowels were shortened again but sometimes (depending on dialect) with a change in quality (the vowels tended to become higher). The latter changes came to be incorporated into the standard language only in the case of long o and the long nasal vowel. The vowel shift may thus be presented as follows:
 long oral  > short oral  (certain dialects:)
 long oral  > short oral  (certain dialects: ,  or )
 long oral  or  > short oral  or 
 long oral  > short oral , written ó
 long oral  > short oral , written u
 long nasal  > short nasal , written ą

In most circumstances, consonants were palatalized when followed by an original front vowel, including the soft yer (ь) that was often later lost. For example: *dьnь became dzień ('day'), while *dьnьmъ became dniem ('day' instr.).

Nasal vowels *ę and *ǫ of late Proto-Slavic merged (*ę leaving a trace by palatalizing the preceding consonant) to become the medieval Polish vowel , written ø. Like other Polish vowels, it developed long and short variants. The short variant developed into present-day  ę, while the long form became , written ą, as described above. Overall:
 Proto-Slavic *ę > ię when short, ią when long (where the i represents palatalization of the preceding consonant)
 Proto-Slavic *ǫ > ę when short, ą when long

The historical shifts are the reason for the alternations o:ó and ę:ą commonly encountered in Polish morphology: *rogъ ('horn') became róg due to the loss of the following yer (originally pronounced with a long o, now with ), and the instrumental case of the same word went from *rogъmъ to rogiem (with no lengthening of the o). Similarly, *dǫbъ ('oak') became dąb (originally with the long form of the nasal vowel), and in the instrumental case, *dǫbъmъ the vowel remained short, causing the modern dębem.

Dialectal variation
Polish dialects differ particularly in their realization of nasal vowels, both in terms of whether and when they are decomposed to an oral vowel followed by a nasal consonant and in terms of the quality of the vowels used.

Consonants 
The Polish consonant system is more complicated; its characteristic features include the series of affricates and palatal consonants that resulted from four Proto-Slavic palatalizations and two further palatalizations that took place in Polish and Belarusian.

Phonemes
The consonant phonemes of Polish are as follows:

The postalveolar sounds (sz, ż, cz, dż) and the corresponding alveolo-palatals (ś, ź, ć, dź) both sound similar to the English palato-alveolar consonants (the sh and ch sounds and their voiced equivalents). The tongue shape of the postalveolar sounds is similar to the shape postalveolar approximant  (one of the realizations of the English /r/ phoneme, see also Pronunciation of English /r/). The alveolo-palatals are pronounced with the body of the tongue raised to the hard palate but a greater area of the front of the tongue is raised close to the hard palate compared to the English palato-alveolar sounds. The series are known as "rustling" (szeleszczące) and "humming" (szumiące) respectively; the equivalent alveolar series (s, z, c, dz) is called "hissing" (syczące).

Polish contrasts affricates and stop–fricative clusters by the fricative components being consistently longer in clusters than in affricates. Stops in clusters may have either a plosive release accompanied by a weak aspiration or a fricated release (as in an affricate) depending on the rate of speech and individual speech habits.

Both realizations of stop-fricative clusters are considered correct and typically respelled as tsz, d-ż and czsz, dżż respectively in normative descriptions of Polish pronunciation. The distinction is lost in colloquial pronunciation in south-eastern Poland both being realized as simple affricates as in some Lesser Polish dialects.

On the same grounds as for   gives  a phonemic status for speakers who have  in their system.

Allophones
  are labial except before  where they are palatalized . 
  have a labiodental allophone , which occurs before labiodental consonants (as in symfonia 'symphony' or konfiguracja 'configuration'). This occurs in loanwords, and in free variation with the typical consonantal pronunciation (e.g. instynkt  'instinct').
  are denti-alveolar  except before /i, j/ and postalveolar consonants. They are pronounced with the tip of the tongue very close or touching to the upper front teeth and partially the front of the alveolar ridge. In western and northern Poland,  is maintained in native words across a morpheme boundary in nk, e.g. sionka ('a small hallway')  contrasts with siąka ('((s)he sniffs') . In other parts of Poland, the contrast is neutralized towards , i.e.  is used for both. In foreign words nk, ng represent .
  are palatalized laminal alveolar  before  in recent borrowings. They are pronounced with the blade of the tongue very close or touching the alveolar ridge.
  are apical alveolar  before apical postalveolar  while  is apical alveolar  before .
  can be assimilated to affricates  before ,  before  and  before .
  can be assimilated to  before  and to  before .
  are variously described as apical postalveolar  or as (laminal) flat postalveolar. They are articulated with a flat, retracted tongue body, the tongue tip being raised and the entire blade moved up and back behind the corner of the alveolar ridge. They may be described as retroflex  to indicate that they are not palatalized laminal postalveolar . Strictly speaking, this is at odds with the narrower definition of retroflex consonants as subapical, in which the tongue curls back and its underside becomes the active articulator. Occasionally,  were used in a similar vein.
 become palatalized laminal postalveolar  before  in recent loanwords.
  are alveolo-palatal . They are articulated with the blade of the tongue behind the alveolar ridge and the body of the tongue raised toward the palate. Before fricatives,  is usually realized as a nasalized palatal approximant , for example, państwo ('state/country') , Gdańsk . 
  are velar . Before fricatives and word-finally,  is realized as nasalized velar approximant .
  is primarily velar ; it has the strongest friction before consonants , weaker friction before vowels  and weakest friction intervocalically, where it may be realized as glottal  (this variant "may appear to be voiced").  has a voiced allophone , which occurs whenever  is followed by a voiced obstruent (even across a word boundary), in accordance with the rules given under § Voicing and devoicing below.
  before  are postpalatal .
  is apical alveolar  and becomes denti-alveolar  before a following denti-alveolar consonant . A palatalized laminal  or alveopalatal  is used before .
  is apical alveolar. It has been traditionally classified as a trill , with a tap  supposedly only occurring as an allophone or in fast speech. However, more recent studies show that  is predominantly realized as a tap , sometimes as an approximant or a fricative, but almost never as a trill. One study found that in an intervocalic context a trilled  occurs in less than 3% of cases, while a tapped  occurred in approximately 95% of cases. Another study by the same researcher showed that in a postconsonantal position,  is realized as a tapped  in 80–90% of cases, while trilled  occurs in just 1.5% of articulations. A palatalized laminal tap  is used before  in recent loanwords.
  is a palatal approximant .
  is a velar approximant .
 The approximants  may be regarded as non-syllabic vowels when they are not followed by a vowel. For example, raj ('paradise') , dał ('he gave') , autor ('author') .
  are regularly devoiced  after a voiceless obstruent and optionally after a voiced obstruent which was devoiced. (See § Voicing and devoicing below.)

Distribution
Polish, like other Slavic languages, permits complex consonant clusters, which often arose from the disappearance of yers (see § Historical development above). Polish can have word-initial and word-medial clusters of up to four consonants, whereas word-final clusters can have up to five consonants. Examples of such clusters can be found in words such as bezwzględny  ('unconditional' or 'heartless', 'ruthless'), źdźbło  ('blade of grass'),   ('shock'), and krnąbrność  ('disobedience').

For the restrictions on combinations of voiced and voiceless consonants in clusters, see § Voicing and devoicing below. Unlike languages such as Czech, Polish does not have syllabic consonants: the nucleus of a syllable is always a vowel.

The consonant  is restricted to positions adjacent to a vowel. It also cannot precede i or y. (For other restrictions on consonants appearing before i or y, see § Distribution above.)

Voicing and devoicing

Polish obstruents (stops, affricates and fricatives) are subject to voicing and devoicing in certain positions. This leads to neutralization of voiced/voiceless pairs in those positions (or equivalently, restrictions on the distribution of voiced and voiceless consonants). The phenomenon applies in word-final position and in consonant clusters.

In Polish consonant clusters, including across a word boundary, the obstruents are all voiced or all voiceless. To determine (based on the spelling of the words) whether a given cluster has voiced or voiceless obstruents, the last obstruent in the cluster, excluding w or rz (but including ż), should be examined to see if it appears to be voiced or voiceless. The consonants n, m, ń, r, j, l, ł do not represent obstruents and so do not affect the voicing of other consonants; they are also usually not subject to devoicing except when surrounded by unvoiced consonants. Some examples follow (click the words to hear them spoken):
   ('boat'),  →  before the voiceless k
   ('jackdaw'),  →  before the voiceless k
   ('also'),  →  before the voiced ż
   ('as if'),  →  before the voiced b
   ('bush'),  → ; rz does not determine the voicing of the cluster
   ('to replay'),  →  &  → ; w does not determine the voicing of the cluster
 dach domu  ('roof of the house'),  → ; the rule still applies across a word boundary

In some dialects of Wielkopolska and the eastern borderlands,  remains voiced after voiceless consonants.

Utterance-finally, obstruents are pronounced voiceless. If followed by a word beginning with a obstruent then the above cluster rules apply across morpheme boundaries. When the second word begins with a sonorant the voicing of any preceding word-final obstruent varies regionally. On the other hand, they are voiceless (devoicing pronunciation) in eastern and northern Poland ( is pronounced ). This rule does not apply to prepositional clitics w, z, bez, przez, nad, pod, od, przed which are always voiced before sonorants.

Hard and soft consonants
Multiple palatalizations and some depalatalizations that took place in the history of Proto-Slavic and Polish have created quite a complex system of what are often called "soft" and "hard" consonants. These terms are useful in describing some inflection patterns and other morphological processes, but exact definitions of "soft" and "hard" may differ somewhat.

"Soft" generally refers to the palatal nature of a consonant. The alveolo-palatal sounds ń, ś, ź, ć, dź are considered soft, as normally is the palatal j. The l sound is also normally classed as a soft consonant: like the preceding sounds, it cannot be followed by y but takes i instead. The palatalized velars ,  and  might also be regarded as soft on this basis.

Consonants not classified as soft are dubbed "hard". However, a subset of hard consonants, c, dz, sz, ż/rz, cz, dż, often derive from historical palatalizations (for example, rz usually represents a historical palatalized r) and behaves like the soft consonants in some respects (for example, they normally take e in the nominative plural). These sounds may be called "hardened" or "historically soft" consonants.

The historical palatalized forms of some consonants have developed in Polish into noticeably different sounds: historical palatalized t, d, r have become the sounds now represented by ć, dź, rz respectively. Similarly palatalized s, z, n became the sounds ś, ź, ń. These developments are reflected in some regular morphological changes in Polish grammar, such as in noun declension.

Phonological status of palatalized consonants

In some phonological descriptions of Polish, however, consonants, including especially the labials m, p, b, f, w, are regarded as occurring in "hard" and "soft" pairs. These consonants are then also analyzed as soft when they precede the vowel  (as in pić  'to drink'). Unlike their equivalents in Russian, these consonants cannot retain their softness in the syllable coda (when not followed by a vowel).

Similar considerations lead to two competing analysis of palatalized velars. Phonemes ,  and  do not occur before  where they are separated by a distinct  e.g. kiosk   ('kiosk'), filologia   ('philology'), Hiob   ('Job'). This analysis is based on an assumption that there is actually no  but only  as chie, hie occur only in loanwords. However, a decomposed palatalization of kie, gie i.e. ,  in all contexts is a predominant pronunciation in contemporary Polish. This is the main analysis presented above.

The consonants t, d, r (and some others) can also be regarded as having hard and soft forms according to the above approach, although the soft forms occur only in loanwords such as tir  ('large lorry'; see TIR). If the distinction is made for all relevant consonants, then y and i can be regarded as allophones of a single phoneme, with y following hard consonants and i following soft ones (and in initial position).

Glottal stop
In more contemporary Polish, a phonetic glottal stop may appear as the onset of a vowel-initial word (e.g. Ala ). It may also appear following word-final vowels to connote particular affects; for example, nie ('no') is normally pronounced , but may instead be pronounced  or in a prolonged interrupted . This intervocalic glottal stop may also break up a vowel hiatus, even when one appears morpheme-internally, as in poeta ('poet')  or Ukraina ('Ukraine') . A relatively new phenomenon in Polish is the expansion of the usage of glottal stops. In the past, initial vowels were pronounced with an initial voiceless glottal fricative (so that Ala was pronounced ), pre-iotation (so that igła ('needle') was pronounced ), or pre-labialization (so that oko 'eye' was pronounced ).

Dialectal variation
In some Polish dialects (found in the eastern borderlands and in Upper Silesia) there is an additional voiced velar fricative //, represented by the letter . It may be actually a voiced glottal fricative [] for some speakers, especially word-finally. In most varieties of Polish, both  and  represent .

On the other hand, some Poles view the lateral variant with nostalgia, associating it with the elegant culture of interwar Poland.

Stress 
The predominant stress pattern in Polish is penultimate: the second-last syllable is stressed. Alternating preceding syllables carry secondary stress: in a four-syllable word, if the primary stress is on the third syllable, there will be secondary stress on the first.

Each written vowel represents one syllable although the letter i normally does not represent a vowel when it precedes another vowel (it represents either , palatalization of the preceding consonant, or both depending on analysis; see Polish orthography and the above). Also, the letters u and i sometimes represent only semivowels after another vowel, as in autor  ('author'), mostly in loanwords (so not in native nauka  'science, the act of learning', for example, nor in nativized Mateusz  'Matthew').

Some loanwords, particularly from classical languages, have the stress on the antepenultimate (third-last) syllable. For example, fizyka ('physics') is stressed on the first syllable. That may lead to a rare phenomenon of minimal pairs differing only in stress placement: muzyka  'music' vs. muzyka  – genitive singular of muzyk 'musician'. When further syllables are added at the end of such words through suffixation, the stress normally becomes regular: uniwersytet ('university') has irregular stress on the third (or antepenultimate) syllable, but the genitive uniwersytetu and derived adjective uniwersytecki have regular stress on the penultimate syllables. Over time, loanwords become nativized to have a penultimate stress.

Another class of exceptions is verbs with the conditional endings -by, -bym, -byśmy etc. Those endings are not counted in determining the position of the stress: zrobiłbym ('I would do') is stressed on the first syllable and zrobilibyśmy ('we would do') on the second. According to prescriptive grammars, the same applies to the first and second person plural past tense endings -śmy, -ście although this rule is often ignored in colloquial speech (so zrobiliśmy 'we did' is said to be correctly stressed on the second syllable, although in practice it is commonly stressed on the third as zrobiliśmy). The irregular stress patterns are explained by the fact that these endings are detachable clitics rather than true verbal inflections: for example, instead of kogo zobaczyliście? ('whom did you see?') it is possible to say kogoście zobaczyli? – here kogo retains its usual stress (first syllable) in spite of the attachment of the clitic. Reanalysis of the endings as inflections when attached to verbs causes the different colloquial stress patterns.

Some common word combinations are stressed as if they were a single word. That applies in particular to many combinations of preposition plus a personal pronoun, such as do niej ('to her'), na nas ('on us'), przeze mnie ('because of me'), all stressed on the bolded syllable of the preposition.

See also 
 Evolution of the Polish language
 Polish alphabet
 Polish orthography
 Help:IPA/Polish (a guide to pronunciation of Polish words as represented in Wikipedia articles)

References

Bibliography

Historical phonology

Further reading

 
 
 
 
 

phonology
Slavic phonologies